Bartolomeu Dias<ref>ˈPronunciation: English: di əs; Portuguese ˈdi əʃ; "Dias". Random House Webster's Unabridged Dictionary</ref> ( 1450 – 29 May 1500) was a Portuguese mariner and explorer. In 1488, he became the first European navigator to round the southern tip of Africa and to demonstrate that the most effective southward route for ships lays in the open ocean, well to the west of the African coast. His discoveries effectively established the sea route between Europe and Asia.

Early life
Bartholomeu Dias was born around 1455. His family had a maritime background and one of his ancestors, Dinis Dias, explored the African coast in the 1440s and discovered the Cape Verde Peninsula in 1445.  

Tracing his biography is complicated by the existence of several contemporary Portuguese seafarers with the same name. He was clearly a seaman of considerable experience and may have been trading for ivory along the Guinea coast as early as 1478. In 1481, Dias accompanied an expedition, led by Diogo de Azambuja, to construct a fortress and trading post called São Jorge da Mina in the Gulf of Guinea. Indirect evidence also points to his possible participation in Diogo Cão's first expedition (1482–1484) down the African coast to the Congo River.

Voyage around Africa
Diogo Cão had made two voyages to try to reach the southern end of Africa’s western coastline but had failed both times. Nevertheless, King John II of Portugal remained determined to continue the effort. In October 1486, he commissioned Dias to lead an expedition in search of a trade route around the southern tip of Africa. Dias was also charged with searching for Prester John, a legendary figure believed to be the powerful Christian ruler of a realm somewhere beyond Europe, possibly in the African interior. Dias was provided with two caravels of about 50 tons each and a square-rigged supply ship captained by his brother Diogo. He recruited some of the leading pilots of the day, including Pêro de Alenquer and João de Santiago, who had previously sailed with Cão.Crowley 2015, pp. 17–19

No contemporary documents detailing this historic voyage have been found. Much of the available information comes from the sixteenth-century historian João de Barros, who wrote about the voyage some sixty years later.

The small fleet left Lisbon in or around July 1487. Like his predecessor, Cão, Dias carried a set of padrãos, carved stone pillars to be used to mark his progress at important landfalls. Also on board were six Africans who had been kidnapped by Cão and taught Portuguese. Dias's plan was to drop them off at various points along the African coast so that they could testify to the grandeur of the Portuguese kingdom and make inquiries into the possible whereabouts of Prester John.

The expedition sailed directly to the Congo, and from there proceeded more carefully down the African coast, often naming notable geographic features after saints that were honored on the Catholic Church’s calendar. When they weighed anchor at what today is Porto Alexandre, Angola, Dias left the supply ship behind so that it could re-provision them later, on their return voyage. By December, Dias had passed the farthest point reached by Cão, and on 8 December 1487 he arrived at the Golfo da Conceicão (modern-day Walvis Bay, Namibia). After making slow progress along the Namibian coast, the two ships turned southwest, away from land. Historians have debated whether this happened because they were driven offshore by a storm or because they were deliberately trying to find more favorable winds. Whatever its cause, the change of course brought them success: the ships traced a broad arc around the tip of Africa and, on 4 February 1488, after 30 days on the open ocean, they reached the continent’s southern cape and entered what would later become known as Mossel Bay.

The ships continued east for a time and confirmed that the coast gradually trended to the northeast. Dias realized that they had accomplished Portugal's long-sought goal: they had rounded the southern cape of Africa. Dias's expedition reached its furthest point on 12 March 1488, when it anchored at Kwaaihoek, near the mouth of the Boesmans River—where they erected the Padrão de São Gregório. By then, the crew had become restless and was urging Dias to turn around. Supplies were low and the ships were battered. Although Dias wanted to continue, the rest of the officers unanimously favored returning to Portugal, so he agreed to turn back. On their return voyage, they sailed close enough to Africa’s southwestern coast to encounter the Cape of Good Hope for the first time in May 1488. Tradition has it that Dias originally named it the Cape of Storms (Cabo das Tormentas) and that King John II later renamed it the Cape of Good Hope (Cabo da Boa Esperança) because it symbolized the opening of a sea route from west to east.Crowley 2015, pp. 21–23

At the cape, Dias erected the last of their padrãos and then headed northward. They reached their supply ship in July, after nine months of absence, and found that six of that ship’s nine crewmen had died in skirmishes with the natives. The vessel had become rotten with worms, so they unloaded the supplies they needed from it, and burnt it on the beach. Few details are known about the remainder of the voyage. The ships made stops at Príncipe, the Rio do Resgate (in present-day Liberia), and the Portuguese trading post of São Jorge da Mina. Dias returned to Lisbon in December 1488, after an absence of 16 months.Crowley 2015, pp. 21–23

The Dias expedition had explored a thousand more miles of the African coastline than previous expeditions had reached; it had rounded the southern tip of the continent, and it had demonstrated that the most effective southward ship route lay in the open ocean well to the west of the African coast-a route that would be followed by generations of Portuguese sailors. Despite these successes, Dias' reception at court was muted. There were no official proclamations, and, at the time, Dias received little in recognition of his accomplishments.

Later years
Dias was later ennobled for his accomplishments, and by 1494 he was serving as a squire in the court of King John II. He also served as superintendent of the royal warehouses from 1494 to 1497.

Following Dias’s return from his successful first voyage around Africa’s southern cape, Portugual took a decade-long break from Indian Ocean exploration. King John was beset by numerous problems, including the death of his only son, a war in Morocco, and his own failing health. It was not until 1497 that another voyage was commissioned and Dias was asked to provide assistance. Drawing on his experience with maritime exploration, Dias contributed to the design and construction of the São Gabriel and its sister ship the São Rafael''. These were two of the ships that Vasco da Gama used to sail around the Cape of Good Hope and continue to India. Dias participated in the first leg of da Gama’s voyage but stayed behind after reaching the Cape Verde Islands.
Two years later he was one of the captains of the second Indian expedition, headed by Pedro Álvares Cabral. This flotilla was the first to reach Brazil, landing there on 22 April 1500, and then continuing east to India. Dias perished in May 1500 when captaining a ship near the Cape of Good Hope: four ships, including Dias’s, encountered a huge storm off the cape and were lost on 29 May.

Personal life
Dias was married and had two sons, Simão Dias de Novais and António Dias de Novais. His grandson Paulo Dias de Novais became the first governor of Portuguese Angola and, in 1576, the founder of São Paulo de Luanda.

Legacy
The Portuguese government erected two navigational beacons, Dias Cross and da Gama Cross, to commemorate Dias and
Vasco da Gama, who were the first modern European explorers to 
reach the Cape of Good Hope. When lined up, these crosses point to Whittle Rock , a 
large, permanently submerged shipping hazard in False Bay.

See also
 Dias Cross Memorial
 Diogo Cão
 Diogo Dias

References

Bibliography

External links

 
 Catholic Encyclopedia

1450s births
1500 deaths
15th-century explorers of Africa
Maritime history of South Africa
Portuguese explorers
Portuguese Roman Catholics
Maritime history of Portugal
15th-century Portuguese people
South African explorers
1